is a railway station on the Shintetsu Arima Line located near Arima Onsen, Kita-ku, Kobe, Hyōgo Prefecture, Japan. It is the end point of the line. It is the highest station of Kobe Electric Railway at an elevation of 357 meters, as well as its easternmost station.

History
 November 28, 1928 - Station opened as the terminus of the Kobe Arima Electric Railway under the name "Arima Station" (有馬駅, Arima-eki).
 1929, May or earlier - Station renamed to its current name, Arima Onsen Station.
 January 9, 1947 - Kobe Arima Electric Railway, the station's owner, merges with Miki Electric Railway into Kamiari Miki Electric Railway, today's Kobe Electric Railway.
 October 31, 1989 - The current station building is completed.

Station layout 

The station has a single island platform with two tracks, each of which can hold a four-car train. Both tracks are used interchangeably. The station building is next to the buffer stops. The original Art Nouveau-style station building was renovated into its current form in 1989.

A freight siding used to exist next to track 2, but has been replaced by a parking lot.

Two three-car trains are stabled at the station at night.

Usage 
The following table shows the average number of daily passengers.

Lines
Kobe Electric Railway
Arima Line

Adjacent stations

References

Railway stations in Japan opened in 1928
Railway stations in Kobe
Stations of Kobe Electric Railway